Jo Ellen Pellman (born 1994 or 1995) is an American actor and singer known for her leading role as Emma Nolan in the 2020 Netflix musical film The Prom.

Early life and education 
Jo Ellen Pellman was born in Ohio and grew up in Cincinnati. She was raised by a single mother. Growing up she was in her school's choir, studied tap and ballet, and went to theater camp. 

Pellman graduated in 2018 from the University of Michigan with a BFA in musical theatre and a minor in creative writing. While training she played roles in Me and My Girl, The Drowsy Chaperone, and Grand Concourse. She has also studied Shakespeare at the London Academy of Music and Dramatic Art.

Career 
In 2018, Pellman played bit parts on Comedy Central's Alternatino, HBO's The Deuce, and episode 5 of Season 3 of Amazon Prime's The Marvelous Mrs. Maisel.

Ryan Murphy cast Pellman as the protagonist of The Prom named Emma Nolan, after a nationwide search, in her film debut opposite of Ariana DeBose. Murphy said, "She spoke very movingly about being a queer woman and having a gay single mom who raised her. I remember she walked out and I was just like, 'Thank God, that’s over—we’ve found our girl.'"  It was her first film.

In December 2020, Pellman and DeBose launched the Unruly Hearts Initiative. The initiative was created to help young people connect with organisations and charities that advocate for the LGBTQ+ community.

Personal life 
Pellman identifies as queer and came out to her mother who herself identifies as gay, in her final year of high school.

Filmography

Television

Film

Awards and nominations

References

External links

Official website

21st-century American actresses
Actresses from Cincinnati
American television actresses
American LGBT actors
LGBT people from Ohio
Queer actresses
Queer women
University of Michigan School of Music, Theatre & Dance alumni
1990s births
Living people